Rowland is a ghost town in Linn County, in the U.S. state of Oregon.

History
Rowland was formerly a station on the now-abandoned Southern Pacific Railroad East Side Line, beginning in the 1880s as an Oregonian Railway station. A post office was established at Rowland in 1886, and remained in operation until 1905.

References

External links
Historic image of Rowland from Salem Public Library

Geography of Linn County, Oregon
1886 establishments in Oregon
Populated places established in 1886